The 2001–02 Argentine Torneo Argentino A was the seventh season of third division professional football in Argentina. A total of 19 teams competed; the champion was promoted to Primera B Nacional.

Club information

Zone A

Zone B

First stage

Zone A

Zone B

Final stage

Relegation playoff

Relegation playoff Qualifying

Aldosivi remained in Torneo Argentino A and Gimnasia y Tiro played the Relegation Playoff.

San Martín (T) was relegated to Torneo Argentino B and Cipoletti played the Relegation Playoff.

Relegation playoff

|-
!colspan="5"|Relegation/promotion playoff 1

|-
!colspan="5"|Relegation/promotion playoff 2

Cipolletti remained in the Torneo Argentino A by winning the playoff.
Gimnasia y Tiro remained in the Torneo Argentino A by winning the playoff.

See also
2001–02 in Argentine football

References

Torneo Argentino A seasons
3